Khtum Reay Lech is a village located in the Bat Trang khum (commune), within the Mongkol Borei District of the Banteay Meanchey Province, Cambodia.

References

Mongkol Borey District
Villages in Cambodia